Tozeur is a city in southwest Tunisia. The city is located northwest of Chott el Djerid, in between this Chott and the smaller Chott el Gharsa. It is the capital of Tozeur Governorate. It was the site of the ancient city and former bishopric Tusuros, which remains a Latin Catholic titular see.

History 

During the Roman Empire and the Byzantine Empire and in the Vandal Kingdom, Tozeur was the site of Tusuros, in the Roman province of Byzacena (originally part of Africa Proconsularis).

Bishopric 
At this time it was the seat of a suffragan bishopric, called Tusuros.

Located in the Sahel hinterland of the Byzacena coastline, close to the towns of Aquae and Nefta and south of Capsa and Ad Turres, Roman Tursuros became an important center of Donatism.

The bishopric ceased to function following the seventh-century arrival of Islam.  The remains of an ancient church are visible in the foundations of an old mosque of Tozeur.

Four bishops (two canonical, two schismatic Donatist heretics) are historically documented
Bennatus, partook in the Council of Cabarsussi, held in 393 by Maximianists, a sect of dissident Donatists, and signed their acts.
 Asellicus, 4th-century bishop, known from correspondence with Augustine of Hippo and Donatian of Reims and from tracts against one Aptus who was accused of Judaising. He attended the Council of Carthage (411) where the prevailing Catholics condemned Donatism as heresy.
 Florentinus participated in the Council of Carthage called in 484 by the Arian king Huneric of the Vandal Kingdom, whereafter he was exiled like most Catholic bishops, unlike Aptus, Asellicus' Donatist rival.

Titular see 
It was nominally restored in 1933 as Latin titular bishopric of Tusuros (Latin) / Tusuro (Curiate Italian) / Tusuritan(us) (Latin adjective) of the Roman Catholic Church.

It has had the following incumbents, so far of the fitting Episcopal (lowest) rank:
 Giovanni Benelli (11 June 1966 – 3 June 1977) as papal diplomat: Apostolic Pro-Nuncio to Senegal (11 June 1966 – 29 June 1967), Apostolic Delegate to Western Africa (11 June 1966 – 29 June 1967) and Roman Curia official: Substitute for General Affairs of Secretariat of State (29 June 1967 – 3 June 1977); later Metropolitan Archbishop of Florence (Italy) (3 June 1977 – 26 October 1982), created Cardinal-Priest of Santa Prisca (27 June 1977 – 26 October 1982, his death);
 Thomas Cajetan Kelly (12 June 1977 – 28 December 1981) as Auxiliary bishop of Archdiocese of Washington (D.C.. United States) (12 June 1977 – 28 December 1981); later Metropolitan Archbishop of Louisville (United States) (28 December 1981 – 12 June 2007, his retirement), died in 2011;
 Paul Lanneau (14 February 1982 – 26 January 2017, his death), first as Auxiliary Bishop of Archdiocese of Mechelen-Brussels  (Belgium) (14 February 1982 – 20 March 2002), then as emeritus;
 Bishop-elect Amilton Manoel da Silva, Passionists (C.P.) (7 June 2017 – present) as Auxiliary Bishop of Archdiocese of Curitiba (Brazil).

Geography

Climate
Tozeur has a hot desert climate (Köppen climate classification BWh) typical of the northern edge of the Sahara Desert. The annual average rainfall amount reaches , and the annual mean temperature (day and night) reaches , both making the city hot and dry year-round. The weather is usually settled and sunny throughout the year. Summers are extremely hot with daily highs often exceeding  in the shade, and the sirocco may push temperatures above . During winters, it can sometimes freeze at night and just before the sunrise, as the temperature may drop below .

Modern town 
With hundreds of thousands of palm trees, Tozeur is a large oasis. Dates are exported from Tozeur. In ancient times, before the advent of motorized vehicles, the oasis was important for the transportation through the Sahara, which took place in caravans. The name of the city in antiquity was Tusuros, it was an important Roman outpost. The medina (old city) of Tozeur, contains traditional architecture, fashion and workmanship.

Architecture 
Tozeur, in common with the surrounding Jerid region, is noted for its yellow/brownish brickwork as well as its patterns in geometric designs which form the facades of most buildings in the old city and the new tourist zone.

The old town of Ouled El Hadef (also known as Medina of Tozeur) is an example of the local brickwork which is one of the oldest neighborhoods in Tozeur and was a home for Jews too.

Sport 
Tozeur has a football club who plays in the First Professional Federation of Football in Tunisia, the team is called LPS Tozeur. In 2010–2011 season the club almost made it to the First Professional Federation of Football.

Economy

Overview

Although still the largest part of the local economy, dates and farming are becoming less appealing to the young, who are more often employed in tourism. Tourism is heavily developed and promoted, and Tozeur is considered a center of "desert tourism". The annual "International Festival of Oases" takes place in the town in November and December each year.

The government initiated two large-scale projects:
 Tapping of deep aquifers by wells. This led to the depletion of most natural springs and abandonment of the traditional irrigation canals. Tozeur's oasis has been irrigated based on an open surface canal system designed in the 13th century by engineer Ibn Chabbat. This traditional irrigation system is currently being replaced by a system of concrete pipes. Water that was traditionally free to farmers is now being sold to offset the cost of these projects and pipes.
 The second part of these local projects is the initiation of new oases around town. These oases' productivity is very low and their future highly unstable. This situation is slowly leading to the decay of the old oases (due to salinity, poor planning and lack of skilled workers) with productivity plummeting and the health and future of the oases questionable.

The region around Tozeur is seeing a large influx of unemployed workers and their families from the once rich phosphate region of Metlaoui, Gafsa and Om Laarayes in hope of work in the tourism sector. The phosphate mines are no longer productive and thousands of workers were laid off after the government sold them to European investors.

Overall the region, and Tozeur in particular, is going through a tough time. The region is embracing the unstable tourism economy and shying away from its traditional agricultural based economy. During the first Gulf War the sector suffered with a loss of large number of workers and an increase in unemployment. The same happened during 11 September 2001 attacks and the Iraq War.

Transport 

The city is served by buses, taxis, railway, louage (shared or group taxi), and Tozeur–Nefta International Airport with national and international services from London, Paris, Rome and few other European countries (international flight services are mostly during the summer tourism season). Tozeur lies on the edge of the Sahara desert. Tourism activity is higher in the fall and winter months with Douz Festival among others in late December

People from Tozeur 

 Aboul-Qacem Echebbi (Tozeur, February, 1909 – 9 October 1934), is a Tunisian poet. The current Tunisian anthem is based on one of his poems.
 Abu Yazid Makhlad ibn Kayrad, from the Berber Zenata tribe, nicknamed Sahib al-Himar who led a mostly Berber revolution against the Fatimid ruler al-Qa'im. The revolution, almost a success, was finally crushed by the caliph al-Mansur bi-Nasr Allah.
 Ibn Chabbat also known as Mohamed Ben Ali Ben Mohamed Ben Ali, (16 October 1221 – 17 June 1285 in Tozeur), is a writer, historian, engineer and a respected Tunisian social figure in the 13th century. Ibn Chabbat's main contribution and legacy is an open surface canals system for equitable water distribution in the oasis that is still in use nowadays.
 Ibn al-Kardabūs (13th century), jurist and historian of al-Andalus
 Brahim Dargouthi (born 1955) novelist. "Nafta" a city located in the governorate of Tozeur, formerly, was known as the cradle of knowledge in North Africa. It is the "Koufa" of Africa.

Popular culture 

Tozeur was used as a filming location for the Star Wars saga and Raiders of the Lost Ark (specifically Sidi Bouhlel canyon outside the town and the salt-flats of nearby Nefta). Lucasfilm also built an entire set a few kilometers north-west of Tozeur in the middle of the desert. This set acted as Mos Espa in Star Wars: Episode I – The Phantom Menace. The buildings are still there and can be visited.
The English Patient (9 Oscars) with Ralph Fiennes and Kristin Scott Thomas was partially filmed outside Tozeur.

In May 1984 the Italian singers Alice and Franco Battiato represented Italy in the Eurovision Song Contest with the song "I treni di Tozeur" ("The Trains of Tozeur"), whose lyrics contain several references to Tozeur, the historic train Le Lézard rouge and Tunisian history in general. This song became a chart hit throughout Continental Europe and Scandinavia.

Gallery

See also 

 List of Catholic dioceses in Tunisia

Notes and references

Notes

References

Bibliography

Ecclesiastical history

External links 

 GCatholic - (former &) titular bishopric
 
 Lexicon of the Orient article
 Arabic Atlas of Islamic History
 Star Wars locations in Tunisia

Populated places in Tozeur Governorate
Oases of Tunisia
Communes of Tunisia